Triple Play is the debut album by jazz double-bassist Martin Pizzarelli, who can often be found performing in trios led by his brother, John Pizzarelli. This album features Martin Pizzarelli with his father, Bucky Pizzarelli, on guitar and with Ray Kennedy, pianist from John Pizzarelli's trio.

Track listing 
Bye Bye Blackbird
Tour’s End
As Long As I Live
Polka Dots and Moonbeams
Triple Play
Moonglow
Sister Sadi
Parkside
So That’s Czak
Gee Baby
Ain’t I Good to You
Undecided
Strayhorn

Personnel
Martin Pizzarelli - double-bass
Bucky Pizzarelli - guitar
Ray Kennedy - piano

2004 albums
Martin Pizzarelli albums
Swing albums